National Savings Bank may refer to;

National Savings Bank (Malaysia), a government-owned savings bank in Malaysia.
National Savings and Investments, a government-owned savings bank in the United Kingdom, which was formerly known as the National Savings Bank. 
National Savings Bank (Sri Lanka), a government-owned savings bank in Sri Lanka.